Kharitonovia is a genus of araneomorph spiders in the family Dictynidae, containing the single species, Kharitonovia uzbekistanica. It was  first described by S. L. Esyunin, Alireza Zamani & T. K. Tuneva in 2017, and is only found in Iran and Uzbekistan.

References

Dictynidae
Monotypic Araneomorphae genera